Rogue Male may refer to:

 Rogue Male (novel), a novel by Geoffrey Household published in 1939
 Man Hunt (1941 film), a 1941 film adaption of Household's novel, directed by Fritz Lang
 Rogue Male (1976 film), a 1976 BBC television adaptation of Household's novel, directed by Clive Donner
 Rogue Male (band), a British heavy metal band